Edward G. Rigg (June 7, 1913 – January 1, 2002) was an American professional basketball player. He played college basketball for Carnegie Mellon University. Rigg then played in the National Basketball League for the Pittsburgh Pirates during the 1937–38 season and averaged 4.3 points per game.

References

1913 births
2002 deaths
American men's basketball players
Basketball players from Pittsburgh
Carnegie Mellon Tartans men's basketball players
Guards (basketball)
Pittsburgh Pirates (NBL) players